Jozef Mannaerts (31 May 1923 – 23 October 2012) was a Belgian international footballer.

Honours

Club
Mechelen
Belgian First Division A runner-up: 1951–52
Belgian Cup runner-up: 1953–54

Individual
Belgian First Division A top scorer: 1951–52 (25 goals)

References

1923 births
2012 deaths
Association football forwards
Belgian footballers
Belgium international footballers
People from Geel
Footballers from Antwerp Province